Mount Leinster is a  mountain in the Republic of Ireland. It straddles the border between Counties Carlow and Wexford, in the province of Leinster. It is the fifth-highest mountain in Leinster after Lugnaquilla , Mullaghcleevaun , Tonelagee , and Cloghernagh , and the highest of the Blackstairs Mountains.

Summit access 
The mountain is most often climbed from the Nine Stones, a landmark point at the foot of Mount Leinster, about 8 miles east of Borris. From Borris there is a road to a visitor car park on the mountain. From there the steep 2RN access road leads to the summit. This road is closed to normal traffic and 2RN have now fenced off the transmitter mast from public access to prevent vandalism.

The Nine Stones and the car park lie on the saddle between Mount Leinster and the nearby Slievebawn (Sliabh Bán;). There are in fact ten stones. The origin of the stones is uncertain.

Other sports

Cycling
Mount Leinster has been used in stages of the Tour of Ireland and on many occasions in the FBD Insurance Rás (Rás Tailteann). It may be climbed from the Borris side in County Carlow or the Bunclody side in County Wexford. The last  are very tough reaching a gradient of almost 16%. Although the climb from Bunclody is slightly longer at  its average gradient is 5.9%. The last  of this climb is difficult with a gradient of 16.3%. The mountain is also used by The ML Syndicate (mountain biking club) who use the area for trail riding and MTB sporting events .

Hang gliding
The transmission site is a popular launch location for hang gliding and for radio-controlled gliders. In 2003, a hang glider pilot died from injuries sustained in the crash landing of his flight launched from the mountain. There is a memorial at the peak of the mountain.

Plane Crash 

The four people aboard all died.

Transmission site
The Mount Leinster transmitter is owned and operated by 2RN and at  ASL. It is the highest transmission site in Ireland, and was one of the original five main Telefís Éireann television transmitters when it opened on low power in December 1962. It became fully operational on 12 June 1963 with a 625-line service on VHF Band III Channel F. The RTÉ Radio FM service was added in 1966, and RTÉ's second television channel RTÉ 2 was carried on VHF when it started in 1978. UHF television transmissions from Mount Leinster began in 1996 with the introduction of Teilifís na Gaeilge, now known as TG4. In common with all the other 2RN sites, analogue television transmissions from Mount Leinster ceased on 24 October 2012.
Today the site provides the Irish digital television service Saorview, and eight FM radio stations to a large area of South East Ireland.

Current transmissions

Digital television

FM radio

Relay

Relay transmitters that rebroadcast digital television from Mount Leinster:

See also

Lists of mountains in Ireland
List of Irish counties by highest point
List of mountains of the British Isles by height
List of P600 mountains in the British Isles
List of Marilyns in the British Isles
List of Hewitt mountains in England, Wales and Ireland

References 

Leinster
Leinster
Leinster
Leinster
Transmitter sites in Ireland
Highest points of Irish counties
Leinster